My Life So Far is a 1999 film about a year in the life of a ten-year-old Scottish boy. It was directed by Hugh Hudson, with screenplay by Simon Donald. The film is set in 1927 and is based on the memoirs of Denis Forman, a British television executive.

Plot
The film tells the story of how the Pettigrew family, living in their family estate Kiloran House in Scotland, deal with changes brought by the end of World War I, told through the point of view of one of the Pettigrew children, Fraser (Robert Norman).

The family is headed by the maternal grandmother MacIntosh (Rosemary Harris), affectionately known as  "Gamma", whose decisions are to be obeyed without question. Gamma's son Morris (Malcolm McDowell) left home to build a career for himself and become a well-to-do businessman; while her younger daughter Moira (Mary Elizabeth Mastrantonio) followed the traditional route – she fell in love with Edward Pettigrew (Colin Firth), gave up becoming an opera singer and settled down at her family estate to raise a large family.

Edward typical of country gentry – owns a minor business (turning sphagnum moss into medical dressings), pious and defender of traditional values (gives a speech at every Sunday service), loves and listens only to Beethoven and has a passion for inventions and mechanical improvements all over the estate. All of which are laughed at by Morris, who lives in London but comes back to visit often, as he is competing with Edward to inherit the estate after Gamma passes away; they mutually loathe each other.

Edward does not appreciate and resists changes in the world, but the harder he tries, the more things fall apart. Morris and his beautiful and charming French fiancée Heloise (Irène Jacob) introduce jazz to the children ("the sound of the devil speaking" according to Edward). An emergency landing brings the eldest daughter Elspeth's (Kelly Macdonald) first suitor – French show pilot Gabriel Chenoux (Tchéky Karyo). Fraser finds grandfather MacIntosh's hidden book collection, and to rebel against his father, sets out to read them all. He misunderstands the definition of "prostitution", and believing it to be a business term, suggests to all guests at Morris and Heloise's engagement party that Moira, Heloise and Gamma should go into prostitution to enhance the moss business. Worst of all, Edward makes a pass at Heloise prior to the wedding.

During a curling game held in her husband's honor, Gamma falls through the ice into the lake, which shortly causes her death by pneumonia. She bequeathed the estate to Edward, leading to a physical altercation between Edward and Morris at her wake, during which Edward claims that Morris lost more than the estate to him. Thereby, Moira finally confronts him, saying she has been aware of him and Heloise all along.

Months pass before Edward finally wins back Moira, and the family settles back into its old routine. On a Sunday morning, all Pettigrews are heading to church, except Fraser. Edward finds him relaxing in a chaise longue in the library, a cognac glass filled with milk in one hand and a lit cigar in the other, swaying his head and body to Louis Armstrong's "On the Sunny Side of the Street" (a secret gift from Heloise). Instead of being angry, he smiles and closes the door, leaving Fraser to enjoy himself.

Cast
 Colin Firth as Edward Pettigrew
 Rosemary Harris as Gamma MacIntosh
 Irène Jacob as Aunt Heloise
 Mary Elizabeth Mastrantonio as Moira 'Mumsie' Pettigrew
 Malcolm McDowell as Uncle Morris MacIntosh
 Robert Norman as Fraser Pettigrew
 Tchéky Karyo as Gabriel Chenoux
 Kelly Macdonald as Elspeth Pettigrew
 Titus MacTavish as village boy
 Jamie MacTavish as a gardener
 Douglas Forrest as Colin Firth body double

Reception
My Life So Far received fairly positive reviews from critics, as it currently holds a 70% rating on Rotten Tomatoes based on 27 reviews.

References

External links
 
 
 
 
 Roger Ebert's review of the film

1999 films
British biographical films
British coming-of-age films
Films based on biographies
Films directed by Hugh Hudson
Films set in 1927
Films set in Scotland
Films produced by David Puttnam
Films scored by Howard Blake
1990s English-language films
1990s British films